The Statute Law Revision Act 1874 (No. 2) (37 & 38 Vict c 96) is an Act of the Parliament of the United Kingdom.

It was intended, in particular, to facilitate the preparation of the revised edition of the statutes then in progress.

This Act was repealed for the United Kingdom by Group 1 of Part IX of Schedule 1 to the Statute Law (Repeals) Act 1998.

The enactments which were repealed (whether for the whole or any part of the United Kingdom) by this Act were repealed so far as they extended to the Isle of Man on 25 July 1991.

This Act was retained for the Republic of Ireland by section 2(2)(a) of, and Part 4 of Schedule 1 to, the Statute Law Revision Act 2007.

Section 2
This section provided that the Statute Law Revision Act 1874 was to be read and construed as if, in the entry in the Schedule to that Act relating to the Piracy Act 1837 (7 Will 4 & 1 Vict c 88), the words "Section Six" and "Section Seven" had been substituted for the words "Section Four" and "Section Five" respectively. This section was repealed by the Statute Law Revision Act 1894 (57 & 58 Vict c 56).

Schedule
The Schedule to this Act was repealed by the Statute Law Revision Act 1894 (57 & 58 Vict c 56).

See also
Statute Law Revision Act

References
Halsbury's Statutes,
Incorporated Council of Law Reporting for England and Wales. The Law Reports: The Public General Statutes passed in the Thirty-Seventh and Thirty-Eighth Years of the Reign of Her Majesty Queen Victoria, 1874. London. 1874. Pages 584 et seq. Digitised copy from Internet Archive.

External links
List of amendments and repeals in the Republic of Ireland from the Irish Statute Book
  ["Note" and "Schedule" of the bill (unlike the schedule of the act as passed) gives commentary on each scheduled act, noting any earlier repeals and the reason for the new repeal]

United Kingdom Acts of Parliament 1874